Guy Orlando Rose (3 March 1867 – 17 November 1925) was an American Impressionist painter and California resident, who received national recognition in the late 19th and early 20th centuries.

Early life and education
Guy Orlando Rose was born March 3, 1867, in San Gabriel, California. He was the seventh child of Leonard John Rose and Amanda Jones Rose. His father was a prominent California senator. He and his wife raised their large family on an expansive Southern California ranch and vineyard – the San Gabriel Valley town of Rosemead bears the family name.

In 1876, Guy Rose was accidentally shot in the face during a hunting trip with his brothers, he was only nine years old. While recuperating he began to sketch and use watercolors and oil paints. He graduated from Los Angeles High School in 1884. After graduation he moved to San Francisco where he studied art between 1885 and 1888 at the San Francisco Art Association's California School of Design with Virgil Williams, Warren E. Rollins, and the Danish-born artist Emil Carlsen.  In 1886, he received honorable mentions in both drawing and oil painting; a year later he was given the school's coveted Avery Gold Medal in oil painting and contributed a still life with “excellent tone” to the Winter Annual of the San Francisco Art Association.

On September 12, 1888, Rose enrolled at the Académie Julian in Paris and studied with Benjamin-Constant, Jules Lefebvre, Lucien Doucet, and Jean-Paul Laurens while in Paris. In 1888–89, he won a scholarship at the Académie Delacluse and contributed religious and figural studies as well as landscapes to the Paris Salons in 1890, 1891, 1894, 1900, and 1909.  He met fellow students brothers Frank Vincent DuMond and Frederick Melville DuMond at the Académie Julian – Frank Vincent DuMond and Guy Rose were to remain lifelong friends.

Career 
Rose lived in New York City, New York in the 1890s and illustrated for Harper's, Scribners, and Century. Choosing to return to France in 1899, he and his wife Ethel Rose bought a cottage at Giverny. In 1900 he resided in Paris and spent the winter in Briska, Algeria where he painted three known paintings. From 1904 to 1912 husband and wife lived in Giverny and his works from this period show the influence of "the master" Claude Monet, who became his friend and mentor.

In 1913 to 1914 the Roses summered in and held an outdoor sketching school at Narragansett, Rhode Island.

Suffering on and off again from the effects of lead poisoning, Rose and his wife moved permanently to Los Angeles, California in 1914.

Between 1918 and 1920 the Roses not only painted in Carmel-by-the-Sea, California as summer residents, they became exhibiting members of the local art colony.  In 1919 they leased the Carmel cottage of artist Alice Comins.  Guy's oils appeared at the Thirteenth and Fourteenth Annual Exhibitions of the Carmel Arts and Crafts Club in 1919 and 1920.   At the latter he displayed The Beach and The Point.  In the fall of 1921 his two Carmel paintings at the Hotel Del Monte Art Gallery in Monterey were said to “possess the charm of the subject . . . rendered with much feeling.”

In Los Angeles, Guy Rose taught and served as Director of the Stickney Memorial Art School in Pasadena.

In 1921 he suffered a debilitating stroke that left him paralyzed. Guy Rose died in Pasadena, California on November 17, 1925. In 1926 the Stendahl Gallery held a memorial exhibition of his works.

Image gallery

References

Further reading 
Literature: Plein Air Painters of the Southland, by Ruth Lily Westphal, 1996;
Literature: Guy Rose American Impressionist, by Will South, 1995

External links

Guy Rose at The Athenaeum 
Monterey Coast, Huntington Library, near Pasadena, California

American Impressionist painters
1867 births
1925 deaths
Modern painters
People from the San Gabriel Valley
Painters from California
Académie Julian alumni
San Francisco Art Institute alumni
20th-century American painters
20th-century American male artists
American male painters